Lithium phosphide is an inorganic compound of lithium and phosphorus with the chemical formula .

Synthesis
Heating white phosphorus and lithium in an argon atmosphere:
12Li + P_4 -> 4Li3P

Reaction of monolithium phosphide and lithium:
LiP + 2Li -> Li3P

Physical properties
Lithium phosphide forms red-brown crystals of hexagonal systems, space group P63/mmc, cell parameters a = 0.4264 nm, c = 0.7579 nm, Z = 2.

Chemical properties
The compound can react with water to release phosphine:

Li3P + 3H2O -> 3LiOH + PH3

Uses
The compound is proposed to be used as a potential electrolyte for solid-state devices.

References

Phosphides
Lithium compounds